Charles William Barnett-Clarke  (16 July 1830 – 23 February 1916) was a long serving  Dean of Cape Town, South Africa.

Clarke was baptised 8 October 1830 at St Chad's Church, Shrewsbury, Shropshire, the son of Charles Thomas Hughes Clarke and his wife, Maria Barnett. He was educated at Worcester College, Oxford and ordained in 1855. After a curacy at St Andrew, Wells Street he was  Perpetual Curate of Toot Baldon, Oxfordshire and then Rector of Cadmore before his South African appointment. He died in Cape Town, aged 85.

Notes

Alumni of Worcester College, Oxford
Deans of Cape Town
1830 births
1916 deaths
Clergy from Shrewsbury
English emigrants to South Africa